El Hadi Khezzar (born 6 August 1967) is an Algerian football manager.

References

1967 births
Living people
Algerian football managers
JSM Béjaïa managers
AS Khroub managers
JS Saoura managers
Olympique de Médéa managers
CA Bordj Bou Arréridj managers
US Biskra managers
ASO Chlef managers
NC Magra managers
Algerian Ligue Professionnelle 1 managers
21st-century Algerian people